P. minutus  may refer to:
 Pelasgus minutus, a ray-finned fish species found only in Albania
 Phrynobatrachus minutus, a frog species found in Ethiopia, Kenya, Tanzania and Uganda
 Pratylenchus minutus, a plant pathogenic nematode species
 Pseudotropheus minutus, a fish species endemic to Malawi

See also
 List of Latin and Greek words commonly used in systematic names#M